Brett Weston Williams (born May 2, 1980) is a former American football offensive tackle in the National Football League. Drafted in the fourth round of the 2003 NFL Draft, Williams played two full seasons for the Kansas City Chiefs. At the beginning of his third season, he suffered a career-ending injury.

His football career developed at Osceola High School in Kissimmee, Florida, where he also excelled in track and field and weightlifting. Following graduation in 1998, Williams joined the Seminoles of Florida State, where he had a highly decorated college career. Starting in two National Championships (and being on the team for a third—his red shirt year), the 1999 Florida State team won the National Championship, defeating Virginia Tech, his [red shirt] freshman year. Williams started all four years of his college career.

Williams earned many awards during his career at Florida State. He earned several All-ACC Honors. He was named a Freshman All-American. In 2002, he was selected as a Playboy All-American, and Williams was twice the recipient of the prestigious Jacobs Blocking Trophy award (given to the top offensive lineman in the ACC) in 2001 and 2002. He also earned the Golden Nole Award, honoring the contributions he made on the field, in the classroom, and in the community. 

Williams has been named one of Florida State's Top 100 Players.

Williams resides in Springfield, Missouri, with his wife, Sarah (also an FSU grad), and their five children. He works in sales, is involved in ministry work, and is the Head Coach for the Lighthouse Christian Chargers. As the Head Coach he led the Chargers to the Homeschool National Championship in 2021.

References 

1980 births
Living people
Players of American football from Orlando, Florida
American football offensive tackles
Florida State Seminoles football players
Kansas City Chiefs players